Gilcrease may refer to:

 Thomas Gilcrease (1890–1962), American oilman, art collector and philanthropist
 Gilcrease Museum, museum located northwest of downtown Tulsa, Oklahoma
 Gilcrease Expressway, highway in Tulsa County, Oklahoma